The 4th British Academy Video Games Awards (known for the purposes of sponsorship as British Academy Video Games Awards in Association with PC World), awarded by the British Academy of Film and Television Arts, was an award ceremony held on 23 October 2007 in Battersea Evolution. The ceremony honoured achievement in 2007 for games which were released between 6 October 2006 and 5 October 2007 and was hosted by Vic Reeves. Wii Sports led with the most nominations with seven. Wii Sports was the major winner on the night, taking six of the seven awards available, equaling the record Grand Theft Auto: Vice City (2003) and Half-Life 2 (2004) had with the most awards won in any BAFTA Video Games Awards ceremony. BioShock took the main prize of Best Game.

Winners and nominees
Winners are shown first in bold.

Academy Fellowship
 Will Wright

Games with multiple nominations and wins

Nominations

Wins

 Two separate franchises (the FIFA and Football Manager series) garnered more than one nomination (with one each for FIFA 07, FIFA 08 Football Manager 2007 (winner of PC World Gamers Award) and Football Manager 2008).

External links
4th BAFTA Video Games Awards page

British Academy Games Awards ceremonies
2007 awards in the United Kingdom
2007 in video gaming
October 2007 events in the United Kingdom